Guillermo Gastón Cotugno Lima (born 17 March 1995) is an Uruguayan footballer who plays as a right-back for Deportivo Maldonado.

Career
In February 2015, Cotugno moved to Russian Premier League side FC Rubin Kazan on loan until the end of the 2014–15 season. Cotugno made his Russian Premier League debut for Rubin Kazan on 9 March 2015 against FC Arsenal Tula. On 19 July 2017, he was released from his Rubin contract by mutual consent.

On 1 August 2017, Cotugno signed a two-year contract with Real Oviedo. The following 20 July, he returned to his home country after agreeing to a deal with Nacional.

Honours
Danubio
Uruguayan Primera División: 2013–14

References

External links

1995 births
Living people
Footballers from Montevideo
Uruguayan people of Italian descent
Uruguayan footballers
Association football defenders
Uruguayan Primera División players
Danubio F.C. players
Club Nacional de Football players
Russian Premier League players
FC Rubin Kazan players
Argentine Primera División players
Talleres de Córdoba footballers
Segunda División players
Real Oviedo players
Śląsk Wrocław players
2015 South American Youth Football Championship players
Uruguay under-20 international footballers
Uruguayan expatriate footballers
Uruguayan expatriate sportspeople in Russia
Uruguayan expatriate sportspeople in Argentina
Uruguayan expatriate sportspeople in Spain
Uruguayan expatriate sportspeople in Poland
Expatriate footballers in Russia
Expatriate footballers in Argentina
Expatriate footballers in Spain
Expatriate footballers in Poland